Morten Hamm (born 4 August 1974) is a Danish former professional footballer who played as a defender.

He has played for Hvidovre IF, Viborg FF, Frem and most recently Nordvest FC, where he retired in the summer of 2010 to become a teacher at the club's football college.

Between 2006 and 2008, Hamm worked as a playing assistant coach at Frem.

References

1974 births
Living people
Footballers from Copenhagen
Association football defenders
Boldklubben Frem players
Danish men's footballers
Hvidovre IF players
Viborg FF players
Holbæk B&I players
Danish Superliga players